Perrowville is an unincorporated community in Bedford County, Virginia, United States.

The Old Rectory, which is listed on the National Register of Historic Places, is located near Perrowville.

References

Unincorporated communities in Bedford County, Virginia
Unincorporated communities in Virginia